Matthew Henry McCloskey Jr. (February 26, 1893 – April 26, 1973) was a Philadelphia businessman and Democratic fundraiser who served as United States Ambassador to Ireland from 1962 to 1964.

Biography
McCloskey was born in West Virginia, and moved to Philadelphia with his family when he was two years old. At the age of 15 he left school and started working in construction; after a few years he started his own company. Buildings by the McCloskey Construction Company include the Rayburn House Office Building and District of Columbia Stadium (now RFK Stadium).

Democratic Party
McCloskey was an active Democrat and was a delegate to the Democratic National Convention in 1936, 1940, 1944 and 1948. In 1955, he became Treasurer of the Democratic National Committee, a role he held until 1962. He is credited with inventing $100-a-plate fundraising dinners.

Ambassador to Ireland
In 1962, McCloskey was appointed ambassador to Ireland by President Kennedy. After confirmation by the Senate, he presented his credentials to Irish leaders on July 19, 1962, and had the official title of Ambassador Extraordinary and Plenipotentiary.

Resignation
In early 1964, it was reported that McCloskey would resign his Ireland post in order to assist with fundraising for that year's presidential election. Shortly thereafter, his construction firm was named in a lawsuit alleging defective work during construction of a hospital in Boston, and in an FBI investigation into the awarding of contracts for District of Columbia Stadium work. His resignation as ambassador became official on June 7, 1964.

Personal life
McCloskey and his wife had six children, including Thomas McCloskey who succeeded his father in running the construction company.  McCloskey died in Philadelphia in April 1973.

References

Further reading

External links

1893 births
1973 deaths
Businesspeople from Wheeling, West Virginia
Ambassadors of the United States to Ireland
20th-century American businesspeople
Democratic National Committee treasurers